The 2004 NCAA Division I women's basketball tournament began on March 20 and concluded on April 6 when Connecticut won a third consecutive national championship, becoming only the second school in history to accomplish such a feat. The Final Four was held at the New Orleans Arena in New Orleans, Louisiana, on April 4–6 and was hosted by Tulane University. UConn, coached by Geno Auriemma, defeated archrivals Tennessee, coached by Pat Summitt, 81–67 in the championship game. UConn's Diana Taurasi was named Most Outstanding Player for the second consecutive year. The tournament was also notable as UC Santa Barbara became the first double digit seed not to lose by a double-digit margin in the Sweet 16 as they lost to UConn 63–57.

Tournament records
 Final Four appearances – Connecticut appeared in their fifth consecutive Final Four, tied for the longest such streak, with LSU (2004–08)
 Rebounds – Janel McCarville, Minnesota recorded 78 rebounds, the most ever recorded in an NCAA tournament
 Assists – Temeka Johnson, LSU, recorded 50 assists, the most ever recorded in an NCAA tournament

Qualifying teams – automatic
Sixty-four teams were selected to participate in the 2004 NCAA Tournament. Thirty-one conferences were eligible for an automatic bid to the 2004 NCAA tournament.

Qualifying teams – at-large
Thirty-three additional teams were selected to complete the sixty-four invitations.

Bids by conference
Thirty-one conferences earned an automatic bid. In twenty-three cases, the automatic bid was the only representative from the conference. Thirty-three additional at-large teams were selected from eight of the conferences.

First and second rounds

In 2004, the field remained at 64 teams. The teams were seeded, and assigned to four geographic regions, with seeds 1-16 in each region. In Round 1, seeds 1 and 16 faced each other, as well as seeds 2 and 15, seeds 3 and 14, seeds 4 and 13, seeds 5 and 12, seeds 6 and 11, seeds 7 and 10, and seeds 8 and 9. Sixteen sites for the first two rounds were determined approximately a year before the team selections and seedings were completed, following a practice established in 2003.

The following table lists the region, host school, venue and the sixteen first and second round locations:

Regionals and Final Four

The Regionals, named for the general location, were held from March 27 to March 30 at these sites:
 Midwest Regional  Lloyd Noble Center, Norman, Oklahoma (Host: University of Oklahoma)
 West Regional  Hec Edmundson Pavilion, Seattle (Host: University of Washington)
 East Regional  Hartford Civic Center, Hartford, Connecticut (Host: Big East Conference)
 Mideast Regional  Ted Constant Convocation Center, Norfolk, Virginia (Host: Old Dominion University)

Each regional winner advanced to the Final Four held April 4 and April 6 in New Orleans at the New Orleans Arena (Host: Tulane University)

Bids by state
The sixty-four teams came from thirty-two states, plus Washington, D.C. Tennessee had the most teams with six bids. Eighteen states did not have any teams receiving bids.

Brackets
Data Source

East Region – Hartford, Connecticut

Mideast Region – Norfolk, Virginia

Midwest Region – Norman, Oklahoma

West Region – Seattle

Final Four – New Orleans

E-East; ME-Mideast; MW-Midwest; W-West.

Record by conference

Nineteen conferences went 0-1: America East, Atlantic Sun Conference, Big Sky Conference, Big South Conference
Colonial, Horizon League, Ivy League, MAAC, MAC, Summit League, MEAC, Missouri Valley Conference, Mountain West, Northeast Conference, Ohio Valley Conference, Patriot League, Southland, SWAC, and West Coast Conference

All-Tournament team
 Diana Taurasi, Connecticut
 Jessica Moore, Connecticut
 Ann Strother, Connecticut
 Janel McCarville, Minnesota
 Shanna Zolman Tennessee

Game officials
 Scott Yarbrough (semifinal)
 Sally Bell (semifinal)
 Tina Napier (semifinal)
 Melissa Barlow (semifinal)
 Greg Small (semifinal)
 Bill Titus (semifinal)
 Dee Kantner (final)
 Melissa Barlow (final)
 Bryan Enterline (final)

See also
 NCAA Women's Division I Basketball Championship
 2004 NCAA Division I men's basketball tournament
 2004 NAIA Division I men's basketball tournament

Notes

NCAA Division I women's basketball tournament
Basketball
Tournament
NCAA Women's division i basketball
NCAA Division I women's basketball tournament
NCAA Division I women's basketball tournament
Basketball in Austin, Texas
Women's sports in Louisiana